The 2016–17 Lietuvos krepšinio lyga was the 24th season of the top-tier level professional basketball league of Lithuania, the Lietuvos krepšinio lyga (LKL). The season started on 21 September 2016, and ended on 9 June 2017.

Žalgiris was the defending champion, and successfully defended its title. The title was the seventh consecutive championship for Žalgiris.

Competition format 
During the regular season, all teams played 36 games. The top eight teams, after playing 36 games each, joined the playoffs, in the quarterfinals, that was played in a best-of-three games format. The semifinals were also played in that format.

The final round was played between the two winners of the semifinals. The final series for the first place was played in a best-of-seven format, while the series for the third place was played in a best-of-five format.

Teams

Regular season
In the regular season, teams played against each other four times, home-and-away, in double a round-robin format. The six first qualified teams advanced to the playoffs. The regular season started on 21 September 2016.

Table

Results

Rounds 1 and 2

Rounds 3 and 4

Playoffs

Attendance data
Attendance data included playoff games:

Clubs in European competitions

Clubs in regional competitions

References

External links
 LKL website

 
Lietuvos krepšinio lyga seasons
Lithuanian
LKL